Salamatu Koroma is a Sierra Leonean judge and a current Justice in the Supreme Court of Sierra Leone. She was appointed as a Supreme Court Justice by Sierra Leone's President Ernest Bai Koroma, and was sworn in on December 5, 2011 after she was confirmed by the Sierra Leone parliament.

A graduate of Fourah Bay College Law School, Salamatu Koroma was previously a judge in the Sierra Leone Appeals Court since 2005, after she was appointed by President Ahmad Tejan Kabbah. Koroma has over thirty five years experience as a practicing lawyer and a judge in Sierra Leone.

Salamatu Koroma was called on to the Sierra Leone Bar Association in 1976 and was appointed State Counsel that same year. Koroma was later appointed as a registrar general of Sierra Leone.

Law career
A graduate of Fourah Bay College Law School, Salamatu Koroma was previously a judge in the Sierra Leone High Court since 2005, after she was nominated by President Ahmad Tejan Kabbah. Koroma has over thirty-five years' experience as a practicing lawyer and a judge in Sierra Leone.

Salamatu Koroma was called on to the Sierra Leone Bar Association and was appointed State Counsel that same year. In 1976 Koroma was appointed as a registrar general. She currently serves as the chairman of the Law Reform Commission in Freetown, Sierra Leone.

References

External links
http://news.sl/drwebsite/exec/view.cgi?archive=7&num=19315&printer=1
http://news.sl/drwebsite/exec/view.cgi?archive=2&num=1250

Year of birth missing (living people)
Living people
Justices of the Supreme Court of Sierra Leone